Cleatlam is a village in County Durham, in England. At the 2011 Census, the population was less than 100. Information is now maintained under the parish of Staindrop.

References

External links

Villages in County Durham